Aloyzas Sakalas (6 July 1931 – 18 July 2022) was a Lithuanian politician, signatory of the Act of the Re-Establishment of the State of Lithuania, and Member of the European Parliament with the Social Democratic Party of Lithuania. Aloyzas Sakalas was also a part of the Socialist Group and sat on the European Parliament's Committee on Legal Affairs.

Aloyzas Sakalas was a substitute for the Committee on Foreign Affairs and a member of the Delegation for relations with Belarus.

Education
 1960: Degree in Engineering from the Kaunas Polytechnic Institute
 1970: Doctorate
 1972: Associate Professor
 1977: Qualification as a Professor of Physics and Mathematics
 1980: Professor at the University of Vilnius

Career
 1960–1962: Engineer at the Institute for Electrographics
 1982–1990: Lecturer of the Associate Professor and Professor at the University of Vilnius
 1989–1991: Member of the Lithuanian Social Democratic Party (LDSP)
 1991–1999: Chairman of the LSDP
 since 1999: Honorary Chairman of the LSDP
 1990–1992: Chairman of the Committee on the Verification of Credentials of the Parliament of the Republic of Lithuania
 1992–1996: Deputy President of Parliament
 1996–2004: Member of Parliament
 2000–2004: Chairman of the Parliament's Committee on Legal Affairs
 1993–2004: Chairman of the organisation 'Help Lithuanian Children'
 Honours

See also 
2004 European Parliament election in Lithuania

References

External links
 
 

1931 births
2022 deaths
Lithuanian physicists
Social Democratic Party of Lithuania MEPs
MEPs for Lithuania 2004–2009
Academic staff of Vilnius University
Kaunas University of Technology alumni
People from Anykščiai
Members of the Seimas